{{DISPLAYTITLE:C3H5O3}}
The molecular formula C3H5O3 (molar mass: 89.07 g/mol) may refer to:

 Etabonate group : CH3-CH2-O-CO-O-
 Lactate anion, found in salts and solutions of lactic acid